Reynolds Learning Academy is a public alternative school in Fairview, Oregon, United States.

Academics
In 2008, 46% of the school's seniors received their high school diploma. Of 74 students, 34 graduated, 20 dropped out, 2 received a modified diploma, and 18 are still in high school.

In October 2009 the school was placed on the No Child Left Behind safety watch list, "because more than 1 percent of their students brought a weapon to school, were expelled for violence or committed a violent crime on campus."

The distinctive appearance and prominent location of this academy make it the signature building for Reynolds School District's main campus. It houses nontraditional high school programs.

The two-story building is organized around a clerestory-topped atrium. The 15 classrooms include two science rooms, a creative-arts lab, and a landscaping work/study lab.

References

High schools in Multnomah County, Oregon
Alternative schools in Oregon
Public middle schools in Oregon
Public high schools in Oregon